Maxim Yuryevich Emelyanychev (Максим Юрьевич Емельянычев; born 28 August 1988, Dzerzhinsk) is a Russian conductor, pianist, harpsichordist and cornetist. From a musical family, Emelyanychev studied music at the Nizhny Novgorod Choral College from 1995 to 2003.

Emelyanychev joined the period instrument ensemble Il Pomo d'Oro in 2011.  He became chief conductor of Il Pomo d'Oro in 2016.  He and the ensemble have recorded commercially for Erato.

In March 2018, Emelyanychev first guest-conducted the Scottish Chamber Orchestra (SCO), as an emergency substitute for Robin Ticciati.  Based on this appearance, in May 2018, the SCO announced the appointment of Emelyanychev as its next principal conductor, effective with the 2019–2020 season.  Emelyanychev and the SCO have commercially recorded for Linn Records the Symphony No. 9 of Franz Schubert, which was on Emelyanychev's debut programme with the SCO in March 2018.  In November 2019, the SCO announced the extension of Emelyanychev's contract as principal conductor through 2025.

References

External links
 Veronique Jourdain Artists Management page on Maxim Emelyanychev

Living people
1988 births
21st-century Russian conductors (music)
Russian male conductors (music)
Erato Records artists
21st-century Russian male musicians
People from Dzerzhinsk, Russia
Moscow Conservatory alumni